Samuel Osborne (1833–1903) was an African American custodian and caretaker at Colby College. Osborne was born enslaved in Lanesville, Virginia on October 20, 1833. After emancipation, he and other family members moved to Maine. Osborne's father was initially hired at Colby, and Samuel succeeded him as custodian after his father's death in 1867. His history and treatment at the college are controversial; in particular, he received low pay from the school and suffered racist pranks at the hands of students. He and his wife Maria Iveson Osborne had seven children. In 1900, his daughter Marion became the first African-American woman to graduate from Colby.

Legacy 

In 1913, Colby alumnus Frederick Padelford published a short book about him. The president's house at the school was renamed in 2017 to honor Osborne and his 37 years of service to the college.

References

Colby College people
1833 births
1903 deaths
Janitors
19th-century American slaves
20th-century African-American people